Matthew French (born 8 July 1981) is a British sport shooter. He competed for England in the double trap event at the 2014 Commonwealth Games where he won a silver medal.

References

1981 births
Living people
English male sport shooters
Commonwealth Games silver medallists for England
Shooters at the 2014 Commonwealth Games
Commonwealth Games medallists in shooting
British male sport shooters
Medallists at the 2014 Commonwealth Games